Charles Foot (14 August 1855 – 2 July 1926) was an Australian cricketer. He played one first-class cricket match for Victoria in 1882.

See also
 List of Victoria first-class cricketers

References

External links
 

1855 births
1926 deaths
Australian cricketers
Victoria cricketers
Cricketers from Melbourne
People from Brighton, Victoria